John Richard Basehart (August 31, 1914 – September 17, 1984) was an American actor. He starred as Admiral Harriman Nelson in the television science-fiction drama Voyage to the Bottom of the Sea (1964–68). He also portrayed Wilton Knight in the pilot episode of the TV series Knight Rider (1982), and provided the narration that was heard during the opening credits throughout the entire series.

Basehart was equally active in cinema, receiving National Board of Review Awards for his performances in Fourteen Hours (1951) and Moby Dick (1956). He was further nominated for a BAFTA Award for his role in Time Limit (1957), the only film directed by Karl Malden.

Career
One of his most notable film roles was the acrobat and clown known as "the Fool" in the acclaimed Italian film La Strada (1954), directed by Federico Fellini. He also appeared as the killer in the film noir classic He Walked by Night (1948), as a psychotic member of the Hatfield clan in Roseanna McCoy (1949), as a timid husband in Tension (1950), as Ishmael in Moby Dick (1956), in the drama Decision Before Dawn (1951), George S. Healey in Titanic (1953) and as Ivan in The Brothers Karamazov (1958). He portrayed a high priest in Kings of the Sun (1963). From 1964 to 1968, Basehart played the lead role, Admiral Harriman Nelson, on Irwin Allen's first foray into science-fiction television, Voyage to the Bottom of the Sea.

Basehart narrated a wide range of television and movie projects. In 1964, he narrated the David Wolper documentary about the Kennedy assassination, Four Days in November. In 1980, Basehart narrated the miniseries written by Peter Arnett called Vietnam: The Ten Thousand Day War that covered Vietnam and its battles from the Japanese surrender on September 2, 1945, to the final American embassy evacuation on April 30, 1975.

Basehart appeared in the pilot episode of the television series Knight Rider as billionaire Wilton Knight. He is the narrator at the beginning of the show's credits. He accepted the lead role in the 1962 film Hitler. He appeared in "Probe 7, Over and Out", an episode of The Twilight Zone, Hawaii Five-O, and as Hannibal Applewood, an abusive schoolteacher in Little House on the Prairie in 1976. In 1972, Basehart appeared in the Columbo episode "Dagger of the Mind", in which  Honor Blackman and he played a husband-and-wife theatrical team who accidentally kill Sir Roger Haversham, the producer of their rendition of Macbeth.

Basehart played a supporting role as a doctor in the feature film Rage (1972), a theatrical feature starring and directed by George C. Scott. Basehart made a few TV movies, including Sole Survivor (1970) and The Birdmen (1971). Both were based on true stories during World War II. Also in the 1970s, he co-starred in Chato's Land (1972) and The Island of Dr. Moreau (1977). In 1979, he appeared as a Russian diplomat with Peter Sellers in Being There.

One month before his death, Basehart narrated a poem during the extinguishing of the flame at the closing ceremonies of the 1984 Summer Olympics.

Personal life

Basehart was born in Zanesville, Ohio, the son of Mae (née Wetherald) and Harry T. Basehart. He was married three times. After the death of his first wife Stephanie Klein, he married Italian Academy Award-nominated actress Valentina Cortese, with whom he had one son, actor Jackie Basehart; the couple divorced in 1960. In 1962, he married his third wife, Diana Lotery, with whom he had two children and remained married until his death in 1984.

Death
Basehart died in Los Angeles on September 17, 1984, following a series of strokes. He was 70 years old. His body was cremated, and the ashes interred at Westwood Village Memorial Park Cemetery in Los Angeles. He died eight days before Walter Pidgeon, his film counterpart in Voyage to the Bottom of the Sea.

Filmography

Film

Television

Awards and nominations

Notes

References

External links

 
 
 
 

1914 births
1984 deaths
People from Zanesville, Ohio
Male actors from Ohio
American male film actors
American male stage actors
American male television actors
Burials at Westwood Village Memorial Park Cemetery
20th Century Studios contract players
20th-century American male actors